The Fioravanti family were a noble family originating in Pistoia in Tuscany and active in Florence and other Italian towns. They were Guelf in their politics and naturally allied with the Cancellieri family and adversaries of the Ghibelline Panciatichi family. An early record dates to 1267, when Fioravanti d'Accorso was a member of the town council. In 1310 Ranieri, his son, was Mayor of the Pistoia. In 1319 Simone di Ranieri was a member of the elders. Giovanni di Puccio di Ranieri Fioravanti was a banker active at the court of Pope Clement V (1305-1314) in Avignon. Andrea di Simone di Baldo Fioravanti was elected Capitano della Montagna Superiore, June 17, 1354.
Francesco di Rinieri was the Gonfaloniere of the Florentine Republic in the years 1385 and 1389: Neri his son was also Gonfaloniere in 1428; Fioravanti di Piero was the Cavalry Captain in Flanders in 1510 and then for Pope Alessandro VI, commissioner at Assedius of Faenza: Vincenzo di Cipriano one of the first to be elected knight of Santo Stefano, in 1576, shortly after the establishment of that military order, and later Chancellor of the Order: Fabio of Cipriano, was Cavalry Captain in the Netherlands: Alberto di Fioravanti Knight of Malta in 1590, and Commendatore in 1610: Niccolao di Fioravanti captain in the emperor Ferdinand II against the King of Sweden in 1636, and in 1643 in Tuscany for the Grand Duke against the Barberini.

References

Fioravanti
 Noble families